This is a list of National Historic Sites in the territory of Nunavut. There are 12 National Historic Sites designated in Nunavut, one of which is in the national park system, administered by Parks Canada (identified below by the beaver icon .

Related to the Sites, National Historic Events also occurred in Nunavut, and are identified at places associated with them, using the same style of federal plaque which marks National Historic Sites. National Historic Persons are commemorated in the same way. The markers do not indicate which designation—a Site, Event, or Person—a subject has been given.

This list uses names designated by the national Historic Sites and Monuments Board, which may differ from other names for these sites.

National Historic Sites

See also

History of Nunavut
List of historic places in Nunavut

References

 
Nunavut
National Historic Sites of Canada